The Spokane Intermodal Center is an intermodal transport facility located in Spokane, Washington, United States. It serves as a service stop for the Amtrak Empire Builder, as well as the Greyhound, Trailways, and Jefferson Lines station for Spokane. The Empire Builder provides service daily between Chicago, Illinois and Spokane before continuing on to Seattle, Washington or Portland, Oregon.

The station was built in 1891 for the Northern Pacific Railway. It was remodeled in 1994 to allow buses to share the station, creating an intermodal facility.

Since 1981, when the westbound Empire Builder arrives in the middle of the night, the first six Superliner cars (five passenger cars, a diner and a baggage car) go to King Street Station in Seattle, while a single locomotive from Spokane takes the last four cars (the Sightseer Lounge, two coaches and a sleeper) to Portland Union Station. The eastbound trains join in Spokane in the middle of the night and run combined to Chicago Union Station. (The next eastbound stop is in Sandpoint, Idaho and the next westbound stops are in Ephrata, Washington for the Seattle section and Pasco, Washington for the Portland section.) In pre-Amtrak days, the Empire Builder split into Seattle and Portland sections at Spokane for most of the 1940s and 1950s.

The station, parking lot, and passenger platform are owned by the City of Spokane. The tracks are owned by BNSF Railway.

Boardings and alightings

Notes

References

External links 

Spokane Amtrak Station (USA RailGuide -- TrainWeb)

Amtrak stations in Washington (state)
Bus stations in Washington (state)
Transportation in Spokane, Washington
Buildings and structures in Spokane, Washington
Railway stations in the United States opened in 1994
Transportation buildings and structures in Spokane County, Washington